Four ships of the United States Navy have been named Barry in honor of Commodore John Barry.

 , a Bainbridge-class destroyer, commissioned 1902, decommissioned 1919
 , a Clemson-class destroyer, commissioned 1920, sunk in action 1945
 , a Forrest Sherman-class destroyer, commissioned 1956, decommissioned 1982, museum ship 1984 - 2015, scrapped in 2021-2022 
 , an Arleigh Burke-class guided missile destroyer, commissioned 1992, in service as of 2014

Sources

United States Navy ship names